Wertheim is a German surname. Notable people with the surname include:

Abraham Carel Wertheim (1832–1897), Dutch banker and philanthropist
Blanka Wertheim (1917–2012), birth name of  Blanka Wladislaw, Brazilian chemist
Dick Wertheim (died 1983), American tennis linesman 
Eric Wertheim (born 1973), American naval expert, columnist and author 
Ernst Wertheim (1864–1920), Austrian gynecologist 
Georg Wertheim (1857–1939), German merchant
Géza Wertheim (1910–1979), Luxembourgian tennis player and bobsledder
Herbert Wertheim, American inventor, scientist, educator and clinician
John Wertheim (born 1968), American lawyer and politician 
Juliusz Wertheim (1880–1928), Polish pianist, conductor and composer
Jon Wertheim (born 1970), American sports journalist and author
Lucy Wertheim (1883–1971), English art dealer
Margaret Wertheim (born 1958), Australian international science writer and commentator
Maurice Wertheim (1886–1950), American investment banker, chess player, and philanthropist
Micha Wertheim (born 1972), Dutch stand-up comedian and satirist
Nicholas Wertheim (1909–2015), birth name of Nicholas Winton, British humanitarian who organised the rescue of 669 children from Czechoslovakia on the eve of World War II in an operation known as the Kindertransport
Pierre Wertheim (1888–1971), French World War I flying ace 
Robert Wertheim (1922-2020), American rear admiral
Rosy Wertheim (1888–1949), Dutch pianist, music educator and composer
Rupert Wertheim (1893–1933), Australian tennis player
Theodor Wertheim (1820–1864), Austrian chemist
Ursula Wertheim (1919–2006), German literary scholar and university teacher

See also
Wertheimer (surname, disambiguation page)

German-language surnames